Michèle Mercier (born 1 January 1939 as Jocelyne Yvonne Renée Mercier) is a French actress. In the course of her career she has worked with leading directors like François Truffaut, Jean-Pierre Melville, Jacques Deray, Dino Risi, Mario Monicelli, Mario Bava, Peter Collinson and Ken Annakin. Her leading men have included Marcello Mastroianni, Vittorio Gassman, Jean-Paul Belmondo, Jean Gabin, Charles Aznavour, Robert Hossein, Charles Bronson, Tony Curtis and Charlton Heston. She has appeared in over fifty films, and is best known for her starring role in Angelique, Marquise des Anges.

Biography 

Mercier was born into a wealthy family; her father was a French pharmacist and her mother Italian. 

Mercier initially wanted to be a dancer. The circumstances of war made this difficult and her parents saw it as only a whim; however, her determination won through and she joined the "ballet-rats", as the dancers of the chorus are termed. She soon advanced to soloist in the Nice Opéra. At the age of 15 she met Maurice Chevalier, who predicted that she would be a success.

She moved to Paris aged 17, and first joined the troupe of Roland Petit, then the company of the "Ballets of the Eiffel Tower". Parallel to her career as dancer, Mercier studied acting under Solange Sicard. For her film début her birth name seemed too long and old-fashioned. It was suggested she take the name Michèle: this happened to be name of her younger sister, who had died at the age of five from typhoid fever. However, she adopted the name as a tribute to the actress Michèle Morgan.

After some romantic comedies and a small role in François Truffaut's Tirez sur le pianiste ("Shoot The Pianist", 1960), she worked in England and made some films in Italy, mainly with a small budget and usually playing women of easy virtue.

Mercier needed a role which could make her a star. In 1963, when it was decided to make a movie of the sensational novel Angélique, the Marquise of the Angels, she got her chance. Many actresses were approached to play the role of Angélique. Producer Francis Cosne wanted Brigitte Bardot for the part, but she refused. Annette Stroyberg was considered next, but judged not sufficiently well-known. Catherine Deneuve was too pale, Jane Fonda spoke French with an American accent, and Virna Lisi was busy in Hollywood. The most serious actress considered was Marina Vlady. She almost signed a contract, but Mercier won the role after trying out for it: she did not appreciate this very much because she was being treated like a beginner at a time when she was already well known in Italy. At the time she was contacted to play Angélique, she had already acted in over twenty films. During the next four years she made five sequels which enjoyed great success. However the role of Angelique was both a blessing and a curse. It catapulted her to almost instant stardom, rivalling Brigitte Bardot in celebrity and popularity, but the character overshadowed all other aspects of her career. By the end of the 1960s, the names "Angélique" and Michèle Mercier were synonymous.

In 1991 she was a member of the jury at the 17th Moscow International Film Festival.

Attempting to break free from the character of Angélique, Mercier played against Jean Gabin in The Thunder of God, directed by Denys de la Patellière. She then appeared with Robert Hossein in La Seconde Vérité, directed by Christian-Jaque. After this she left France and tried to restart her career in the United States, unfortunately without much success.

After a 14-year layoff, she returned in the 1998 film La Rumbera, directed by Piero Vivarelli. In 1999, having lost several million francs in a business venture, Mercier had serious financial problems. She even planned to sell the famous wedding gown of Angélique. The actress confessed in Nice-Matin: "I am ruined, I'll be obliged to sell part of my paintings, my furniture, my properties, my jewels and the costumes of Angélique". In 2002, at the Cannes Film Festival, she presented her second book of memoirs. Mercier was made a chevalier dans l'Ordre des Arts et des Lettres on 6 March 2006.

Personal life 
Mercier married the assistant director André Smagghe in 1961. He was an alcoholic, and later in their marriage had to be hospitalized; they divorced in 1965. After a long relationship she married racing driver Claude Bourillot in 1970, but he disappeared one day with all her jewels and money, leaving her penniless. They divorced in 1976. She explained that her co-star Vittorio Gassman once tried to rape her and that she was pursued by Bettino Craxi and Silvio Berlusconi.

Selected filmography

Quotes 
"When people talk with me they always refer to Angélique, but I have also played fifty other women. I have tried for a long time to forget about her. But now I see her as a little sister who is always by my side and I have learned to live with her."

References

Bibliography

External links 

 Fansite
 
 The Private Life and Times of Michèle Mercier
 Michèle Mercier - Cinémathèque française

1939 births
Living people
People from Nice
French film actresses
20th-century French actresses
21st-century French actresses
Chevaliers of the Ordre des Arts et des Lettres
French people of Italian descent